Units of measurement used in Malaysia and neighbouring countries include the kati, a unit of mass, and the gantang, a unit of volume.

Mass
For mass, the catty equals 0.6 g. Another unit is picul which equals 60 g.

Volume

 The gantang is  equivalent to 4.54609 cubic decimetres. 
 One cupak (alternative archaic spelling: churpak) was 1/4 of a gantang or 1.1365225 cubic decimetres.
 One leng equals 568.26125 cubic centimetres.
 One chentong equals 284.130625 cubic centimetres.

References

Further reading
Malay Fishermen: Their Peasant Economy, by Raymond Firth. Norton (1975) 

Units of volume
Units of mass
Systems of units
Malay culture
Science and technology in Malaysia